Palmer Hall may refer to:

H. Palmer Hall, an American author known as Palmer Hall
Palmer Hall (Colorado College), listed on the NRHP in El Paso County, Colorado